David Ricardo Johnson (born February 26, 2001) is an American professional basketball player for the Raptors 905 of the NBA G League. He played college basketball for the Louisville Cardinals, and was drafted by the Toronto Raptors in the second round of the 2021 NBA Draft.

Early life and high school career
Johnson grew up in Louisville, Kentucky, and attended Trinity High School. As a sophomore, Johnson averaged 10.5 points and 4.8 rebounds per game and was named third team All-State. He was named first team All-State as a junior after averaging 13.9 points, 5.8 rebounds and 5.2 assists per game. Johnson was ranked a four-star recruit and the best college prospect in the state of Kentucky by ESPN and committed to play at Louisville early during his senior year. He de-committed after Louisville was named as part of the 2017–18 NCAA Division I men's basketball corruption scandal, but recommitted after considering offers from Georgia and Xavier. As a senior, Johnson averaged 16.1 points, 7.2 rebounds and four assists per game and was named First Team All-State and the Player of the Year by the Lexington Herald-Leader. He was named the MVP of the Kentucky Sweet 16 state tournament after recording 22 points, 12 rebounds, two assists and four blocked shots in the state title game. He scored 1,472 points and grabbed 719 rebounds in four seasons as a starter at Trinity.

College career
Johnson missed the beginning of his freshman season with an offseason shoulder injury. Johnson played mostly as a key reserve during his freshman season with occasional starts. He scored a season high 19 points with seven assists, four rebounds and three steals in Louisville's upset win over Duke on January 18, 2020. Johnson started at point guard against Syracuse on February 19, 2020, and led the team with seven assists in the 90–66 win in addition to three points. Johnson averaged 6.3 points, 2.8 assists and 2.8 rebounds per game in 27 games with four starts for the season. As a sophomore, he averaged 12.6 points, 3.2 assists and 5.8 rebounds per game. Following the season, he declared for the 2021 NBA draft.  Johnson was a projected lottery pick in the middle of the year for the 2021 NBA Draft

Professional career

Toronto Raptors (2021–2022) 
Johnson was selected in the second round of the 2021 NBA draft with the 47th pick by the Toronto Raptors. On August 8, 2021, he signed a two-way contract with Toronto, splitting time with their G League affiliate, Raptors 905.

Raptors 905 (2022–present) 
On October 15, 2022, Johnson signed an Exhibit 10 contract with the Toronto Raptors and was waived later that day. He then joined the Raptors 905 as an affiliate player.

Career statistics

NBA

|-
| style="text-align:left;"| 
| style="text-align:left;"| Toronto
| 2 || 0 || 1.0 || .000 || .000 ||  || .0 || .0 || .0 || .0 || .0
|- class="sortbottom"
| style="text-align:center;" colspan="2"| Career
| 2 || 0 || 1.0 || .000 || .000 ||  || .0 || .0 || .0 || .0 || .0

College

|-
| style="text-align:left;"| 2019–20
| style="text-align:left;"| Louisville
| 27 || 4 || 16.0 || .493 || .217 || .600 || 2.8 || 2.8 || .7 || .3 || 6.3
|-
| style="text-align:left;"| 2020–21
| style="text-align:left;"| Louisville
| 19 || 19 || 35.1 || .411 || .386 || .700 || 5.8 || 3.2 || 1.1 || .3 || 12.6
|- class="sortbottom"
| style="text-align:center;" colspan="2"| Career
| 46 || 23 || 23.9 || .444 || .349 || .650 || 4.0 || 2.9 || .8 || .3 || 8.9

Personal life
Johnson is a cousin of former Louisville and current professional basketball player Ray Spalding.

References

External links
Louisville Cardinals bio
USA Basketball bio

2001 births
Living people
21st-century African-American sportspeople
African-American basketball players
American expatriate basketball people in Canada
American men's basketball players
Basketball players from Louisville, Kentucky
Louisville Cardinals men's basketball players
Point guards
Raptors 905 players
Toronto Raptors draft picks
Toronto Raptors players